Armen Valerii Grigoryan (born December 25, 1983) is an Armenian politician and political scientist who is currently serving as Secretary of the Security Council of Armenia.

Biography 
Armen Grigoryan was born on December 25, 1983, in Martuni, Martuni District, Nagorno-Karabakh Autonomous Oblast. In 2001 he graduated from the secondary school №2 named after Mesrop Mashtots in Martuni and entered Yerevan State University's Faculty of International Relations. During his study he was conscripted into the NKR Defense Army. In 2009 he entered the MA program in Political Science and International Affairs at the American University of Armenia. In 2011 he graduated from the AUA.

From March 2012 to September 2013 he worked at the "Counterpart International Inc. Armenia" as a civil society officer. From April 2015 to May 2018 he worked at the "Transparency International Anti-Corruption Center" as a project coordinator of the electoral programs. 

In May 2018 the Prime Minister of Armenia Nikol Pashinyan appointed Armen Grigoryan as the Secretary of the Security Council of Armenia. On 15 July 2021, he was appointed First Deputy Foreign Minister, effectively serving as acting foreign minister for a month. On 19 August 2021 he was reappointed to the position of Secretary of the Security Council.

Journalistic and academic activity 
From 2011 to 2013 he wrote a book called "Political Elite in Post-Soviet Armenia: Characteristics and Ways of Formation". 
Since 2011 he has published analytical articles on the Armenia's democratization, civil society development, economic and political as well as geopolitical-international topics for the news websites CivilNet, Mediamax, and EVN Report. Since 2015 he has been a visiting lecturer at the Department of World Politics and International Relations of the Russian-Armenian University.

Political activity
In February 2013 he was the chief of presidential candidate Andrias Ghukasyan's pre-election headquarters. In 2015, during the referendum on the constitutional amendments, he coordinated the observation initiative called "Citizen Observer" involving more than 1000 observers. During the parliamentary elections in April 2017, he coordinated the observation initiative called "Citizen Observer" involving more than 3000 observers. From September to December 2017 he worked as an expert at the Council of Europe on topics of transparency and civic participation. From April to May 2018 he participated in the 2018 Armenian revolution. He was a member of the "Reject Serzh" initiative and held numerous rallies. He was arrested along with the other leaders of the movement and released after Prime Minister Serzh Sargsyan's resignation.

Personal life 
Grigoryan is married and has one daughter. He is the nephew of Armenian Colonel-General Movses Hakobyan.

References

External links
 Publications authored by Armen Grigoryan on Civilnet
 Publications authored by Armen Grigoryan on Mediamax
 Publications authored by Armen Grigoryan on EVN Report

1983 births
Living people
Armenian politicians